This is a list of notable alumni from Maliyadeva College, which is located in Kurunegala, Sri Lanka.

External links
 Official website of Maliyadeva College
 Official website of the Maliyadeva College Alumni Association (Maliyadeva College Old Boys Association)

References

Maliyadeva College
Maliyadeva College